The United States House of Representatives elections in California, 1876 was an election for California's delegation to the United States House of Representatives, which occurred as part of the general election of the House of Representatives on November 7, 1876. Republicans gained two districts.

Overview

Delegation Composition

Results
Final results from the Clerk of the House of Representatives:

District 1

District 2

District 3

District 4

See also
45th United States Congress
Political party strength in California
Political party strength in U.S. states
United States House of Representatives elections, 1876

References
California Elections Page
Office of the Clerk of the House of Representatives

External links
California Legislative District Maps (1911-Present)
RAND California Election Returns: District Definitions

1876
California United States House of Representatives
1876 California elections